The USS Chotank was a schooner captured by the Union Navy during the American Civil War. She was used by the Navy for various purposes, but especially  to patrol navigable waterways of the Confederacy to prevent the South from trading with other countries.

Privateer captured and converted to Union Navy use 

The privateer Savannah was captured 3 June 1861 by USS Perry. She was purchased from the New York City Prize Court on 2 July 1861 by the Navy and her name changed to Chotank.

Assigned to the Potomac Flotilla 
 
Chotank operated as a part of the Potomac Flotilla during the year 1862.

Post-war decommissioning and sale 

She was then was laid up at New York Navy Yard until sold 15 August 1865.

References 

Ships of the Union Navy
Schooners of the United States Navy